Richard Neil Barron (23 March 1934 - 5 September 2010) was a science fiction bibliographer and scholar. His training was as a librarian. He is perhaps best known for his book Anatomy of Wonder: A Critical Guide to Science Fiction. He won the Pilgrim Award for Lifetime Achievement in the field of science fiction scholarship in 1982. He died on September 5, 2010 in Las Vegas, Nevada.

Bibliography
 Anatomy of Wonder: A Critical Guide to Science Fiction (5th ed.). Englewood, Colorado: Libraries Unlimited, 2004. .
 Fantasy and Horror. The Scarecrow Press, Inc., 1999. . 
 Fantasy Literature. Garland, 1990. . 
 Horror Literature. Garland, 1990. . 
 Science Fiction & Fantasy Book Review: The Complete Series, 1979-1980. Borgo Press, 2009. . (with Robert Reginald)
 What Do I Read Next?: A Reader's Guide to Current Genre Fiction. Detroit; Washington, DC; London: Gale Research Inc., 2006. .

Notes

References

 Clute, John and Grant, John. The Encyclopedia of Fantasy (2nd US edition). New York: St Martin's Griffin, 1999. . (Paperback)
 Clute, John Science Fiction: The Illustrated Encyclopedia. London: Dorling Kindersley, 1995. .
 Clute, John and Peter Nicholls, eds. The Encyclopedia of Science Fiction. New York: St Martin's Press, 1995. .
 Disch, Thomas M. The Dreams Our Stuff Is Made Of. Touchstone, 1998.
 Peter Nicholls, ed., The Encyclopedia of Science Fiction. St Albans, Herts, UK: Granada Publishing, 1979. .
 Reginald, Robert. Science Fiction and Fantasy Literature, 1975-1991. Detroit, MI/Washington, DC/London: Gale Research, 1992. .
 Westfahl, Gary, ed. The Greenwood Encyclopedia of Science Fiction and Fantasy: Themes, Works, and Wonders (three volumes). Greenwood Press, 2005.
 Wolfe, Gary K. Critical Terms for Science Fiction and Fantasy: A Glossary and Guide to Scholarship. Greenwood Press, 1986. .

External links
 

1934 births
2010 deaths
American librarians
Science fiction critics
American male novelists
American speculative fiction critics
American science fiction writers
American male non-fiction writers